The Sunshine in the Courtroom Act is a bill to allow the broadcasting of U.S. District Court and U.S. Court of Appeals proceedings. The name of the bill is an apparent reference to Louis Brandeis' remark that "sunshine is the best disinfectant" for ill-doings.  The proposed act relates to Federal Rule of Criminal Procedure 53, which states, "Except as otherwise provided by a statute or these rules, the court must not permit the taking of photographs in the courtroom during judicial proceedings or the broadcasting of judicial proceedings from the courtroom."

The bill was introduced in 2005, 2007, 2008, 2009, 2011, 2013, 2015, 2017, and 2019. The 2009 bill was approved by the Senate Judiciary Committee. The Senate version is S. 657, and the House version is H.R.3054. In 2009, the Judicial Council of the 9th Circuit expressed interest in televising certain proceedings.

In Congressional testimony, Ted Poe stated: When I was Assistant District Attorney, I spent my career trying criminal cases, and based on my experiences, I actually feel the cameras in the courtroom benefit a defendant. A public trial ensures fairness. That is the purpose of a public trial. It ensures professionalism by the lawyers and the judge, and a camera in the courtroom protects the defendant’s right to a public trial. Poe also opined that lawyers play to the jury, not to the camera, and that jurors stated they liked the camera inside the courtroom because they wanted the public to know what they heard "instead of waiting to hear a 30-second sound bite from a newscaster who may or may not have the facts correct." Judge John R. Tunheim opposed the bill, stating that it could deny some defendants a fair trial; e.g. a defendant corporation might forgo its right to a trial because it does not want its president to be cross-examined on television. He also expressed concern that televising trials could increase the incidence of threats against federal judges.

See also
Courtroom photography and broadcasting
Supreme Court of the United States, televised

References

Proposed legislation of the 109th United States Congress